Karin Valborg Ek, born Lindblad (17 June 1885 in Stockholm-1 October 1926 in Gothenburg), was a Swedish writer.

Biography
Ek was the daughter of the doctor Anders Lindblad and Florence Weaving and grew up in Stockholm. She conducted seminars at Anna Sandström's Higher Teacher Seminarium in Stockholm together with Harriet Löwenhjelm and Elsa Björkman. After a short time as a subject teacher, she married the literature historian Sverker Ek in 1909. She had five children, including the actor Anders Ek and the publisher Birgitta Ek. Ek was buried at Östra kyrkogården in Gothenburg.

References

Further reading  
 

1885 births
1926 deaths
Swedish women poets
19th-century Swedish women writers
20th-century Swedish women writers
19th-century Swedish poets
20th-century Swedish poets